Grand Junction station is a train station in Grand Junction, Colorado, United States, that is served by Amtrak's California Zephyr, which runs once daily between Chicago and Emeryville, California, in the San Francisco Bay Area.

The station is adjacent to the original Denver and Rio Grande Depot. The original depot was built in 1906 and replaced by the current adjacent structure in 1992. The current station building was built in the late 1970s and originally used as a restaurant.

Beginning in 1983, both the Desert Wind (with service from Chicago to Los Angeles) and the Pioneer (with service from Chicago to Seattle) stopped at the Grand Junction Station. Service by the Pioneer was dropped when that train was rerouted through Wyoming in 1991 (the train was later discontinued altogether in 1997). Service by the Desert Wind ended when Amtrak discontinued that train in 1997 (at the same time as the Pioneer was discontinued). Also in 1997, the Green River Station (in Utah) station replaced the former station in Thompson Springs, Utah, as the next station to the west.

Notes

References

External links 

Grand Junction Amtrak Station (USA RailGuide -- TrainWeb)

Amtrak stations in Colorado
Grand Junction, Colorado
Stations along Denver and Rio Grande Western Railroad lines
Transportation buildings and structures in Mesa County, Colorado